Pashaei is an Iranian surname. Notable people with the surname include:

 Giti Pashaei (1940–1995), Iranian singer and musician
 Hossein Pashaei (born 1979), Iranian footballer
 Masoumeh Pashaei Bahram (born 1981), Iranian physician and politician

Iranian-language surnames